National Geographic Farsi was a free-to-air documentary channel that was originally launched on 15 October 2011, and relaunched on 1 September 2017. It is the official Persian language edition of the National Geographic Channel. The channel broadcast via Eutelsat W3A. The channel features broadcasts of non-fictional, documentary series, all original National Geographic shows subtitled in Farsi including Whilst the channel was aimed to be broadcast for a Persian-speaking audience in Iran, Afghanistan and Tajikistan, the channel's broadcast was based in Dubai, U.A.E.

It was co-owned by the National Geographic Society/Fox Networks Group. During the channel's shutdown, the Persian edition of the National Geographic magazine, which launched later in 2012, remained in circulation.

Channel shutdown 
The channel was first shut down on 1 May 2013, then after relaunch 28 August 2017, channel shut downed again on Jan 1st 2020 with a short notice in Persian that was published on the channel's Facebook page. The Persian text reads as follows:
As we express our gratitude to our dear audience, please be advised that for unpredictable reasons the National Geographic Farsi broadcast will be stopped as of 1 May 2013. We hope that in the future we will be able to join you again.

Although the channel is shut down, its official and social media sites remain online, albeit inactive.

Relaunch
On 28 August 2017, the channel's official Facebook page announced its relaunch to be on 1 September along a promotional video. Also the new availability information of the channel on Eutelsat 7 and Hotbird 13 were announced on the same day.

References

External links
 Official website 
 Official English website 
 National Geographic Farsi on Facebook 
 National Geographic Farsi on Instagram 

Farsi
Persian-language television stations
Television stations in Dubai
Television channels and stations established in 2011
Television channels and stations disestablished in 2013